The Richmond Carnegie Library is a historic one-story building in Richmond, Utah. It was built as a Carnegie library in 1913-1914 by August S. Schow, and designed in the Classical Revival style by Watkins & Birch, an architectural firm based in Provo. It has been listed on the National Register of Historic Places since October 25, 1984.

References

Carnegie libraries in Utah
Neoclassical architecture in Utah
Libraries on the National Register of Historic Places in Utah
Library buildings completed in 1913
National Register of Historic Places in Cache County, Utah
1913 establishments in Utah